Suvarilladha Chiththirangal is a 1979 Indian Tamil-language drama film, written and directed by K. Bhagyaraj, in his directorial debut. The film stars Sudhakar, Bhagyaraj and Sumathi. It was released on 30 November 1979, and became a box office success. The film was remade in Telugu as Pedala Brathukulu, with Sudhakar and Sumathi reprising their roles.

Plot 

The story revolves around a poor girl living with her widowed mother and siblings. Poverty and the family situation gets her mother to prostitute herself for the welfare of the family. Bhagyaraj treats this subject from the perspective of the girl who sees the wrong of her mother; but later teases the thought of right and wrong with the viewers considering the situation which the mother gets into. Bhagyaraj, himself plays the neighbour who first falls in love with the girl, later to realise that she is already in a relationship with another.

Cast 
 Sudhakar as Murthy
 K. Bhagyaraj as Alagappan
 Sumathi as Saroja
 Goundamani as Kaliyannan
 S. Varalakshmi as Parvathi
 C. R. Parthiban as Murthy's father
 Ganthimathi as Alagappan's mother
 Kallapetti Singaram as Alagappan's father
 Master Haja Sheriff as Aarumugam
 Sangili Murugan
 C. R. Saraswathi as Selvi
 Chandrasekar
Janagaraj as Palanisamy
Charulatha

Production 
Suvarilladha Chiththirangal marked the directorial debut of K. Bhagyaraj. He also acted in the film after one of the actors backed out.

Soundtrack 
The music was composed by Gangai Amaran. The song "Kaadhal Vaibogame" was later remixed by Srikanth Deva for the film Perumal (2009).

Reception 
Kousigan of Kalki appreciated the photography, music and dialogues.

References

External links 
 

1970s Tamil-language films
1979 directorial debut films
1979 drama films
1979 films
Films directed by K. Bhagyaraj
Films scored by Gangai Amaran
Indian drama films
Tamil films remade in other languages